Typhoon Choi-wan was a powerful typhoon that became the first Category 5-equivalent super typhoon to form during the 2009 Pacific typhoon season. By September 12, the depression intensified into a tropical storm, at which time it was given the name Choi-wan. The following day, rapid intensification took place through September 14. Choi-wan attained its peak intensity on September 15, as it moved through the Northern Mariana Islands with the Japan Meteorological Agency reporting peak windspeeds of  10-minute sustained). Additionally, the Joint Typhoon Warning Center reported the storm to have attained winds of  1-minute sustained). The typhoon remained very powerful until September 17 when the storm's outflow weakened. The typhoon underwent an eyewall replacement cycle, leading to intensity fluctuations. By September 19, Choi-wan rapidly weakened as strong wind shear caused convection to diminish. The following day, the system transitioned into an extratropical cyclone and dissipated several hours later over open waters.

Despite the intensity of Choi-wan when it passed through the Northern Mariana Islands, no casualties were reported. However, following the storm, the United States Navy deemed that the island of Alamagan was uninhabitable, with all but one of the structures completely destroyed and most of the islands' trees downed. In response to this, all residents on the island were evacuated to nearby Saipan.

Meteorological history

A broad, low-level circulation center had formed within the system and became increasingly organized, showing signs of developing convective banding. A Tropical Cyclone Formation Alert was released later that day as convection was rapidly consolidating around the low, which was embedded within the eastern end of the monsoonal trough. It was then declared as a tropical depression by the Japan Meteorological Agency (JMA) and the JTWC with the latter designating it as Tropical Depression 15W The tropical depression was tracking westward along the southern edge of the subtropical ridge situated east of the International Date Line.

During September 12, the depression continued to develop quickly with both the JMA and the JTWC reporting that the depression had intensified into a Tropical Storm later that day, with the JMA assigning the international name of Choi-wan and the international designation of 0915. During September 13, Choi-wan gradually developed whilst moving west with the JMA reporting that Choi-wan had become a severe tropical storm late that day, before reporting along with the JTWC early the next day that Choi-wan had intensified further and had become a weak Typhoon with multiple spiral bands that had wrapped into the fully consolidated center to form a banding eye.

Early on September 15, the JTWC reported that Typhoon Choi-wan had intensified further and had become a Category 4-equivalent Super Typhoon whilst passing over the island of Alamagan.

With the help of excellent poleward outflow and high ocean heat content, Typhoon Choi-wan remained at its peak intensity until early on September 17 when deep convection started to erode in the northwestern quadrant as the tropical upper tropospheric trough (TUTT) cell to the northwest was no longer providing good outflow. During September 19, Choi-wan rapidly weakened, as it moved into an unfavorable environment with higher amounts of vertical wind shear, causing the storm's deep convection to erode. As a result of this and dry latitude air wrapping into the low level circulation center, the JTWC decided to downgrade Choi-wan to an extratropical system and released their final advisory, early the next day before the JMA followed suit later that day. The JMA then reported that the extratropical low had dissipated completely, early on September 21.

Preparations

Mariana Islands

Early on September 12, the National Weather Service Weather Forecast Office in Guam, using data from the JTWC, placed Tinian and Saipan under a Typhoon Watch whilst declaring a Tropical Storm Watch also declared for Guam and Rota. By September 15, the islands of Agrihan, Tinian and Saipan before being upgraded to tropical storm warnings and a typhoon watch. Additionally, the watches in place for Guam and Rota were discontinued. These warnings were kept in force until late on September 14, when the warnings for Tinian were canceled and the typhoon watch for Saipan was canceled, while the typhoon watch was upgraded to a Typhoon Warning as Choi-wan rapidly intensified. The Tropical Storm Warning in place for Saipan was canceled during September 15 as Choi-wan intensified into a high-end Category 4 equivalent super typhoon. All watches and warnings were discontinued during the afternoon of September 16 once Choi-wan was no longer a threat to the Mariana Islands.

By September 15, shelters were opened throughout Tinian and Saipan at local schools, most schools and all governmental buildings were closed and residents rushed to board up their homes. The American Red Cross had also mobilized on the islands by this time. Some private schools were open during the morning but let out early to allow students to return to their families before the typhoon's arrival. On Saipan, 179 residents sought refuge in shelters by the afternoon of September 15, by which time heavy rain had begun falling. Only one flight was delayed by the typhoon across all the islands. The youth basketball league in the Northern Mariana Islands canceled their games for the time Choi-wan passed through the islands. At the height of the storm, a total of 270 residents sought refuge in shelters on Saipan.

Japan
Early on September 16 the JMA started to issue Typhoon force wind warnings, for the Naha, Okinawa; however these were discontinued later that day. The JMA then placed the Yokohama, Moji and Naha under a Typhoon Warning early the next day. These warnings were kept in place until early on September 19, when the JMA added the Kushiro and Otaru to the warnings. However, the warnings were dropped for all areas except Yokohama and Kushiro as the typhoon turned away from Japan. These warnings stayed in effect until late the next day when they were cancelled as Choi-wan began to dissipate.

Impact and aftermath

The most recent storm of Choi-wan's intensity to strike the islands was Chaba in 2004. That storm caused severe damage and widespread flooding. Unlike Chaba, relatively little rainfall fell due to Choi-wan, and no flooding was reported. The main effects from the typhoon in Saipan were downed trees which littered streets across the islands. Power lines were downed and sewer pipes were broken; however, crews began repairing damage once Choi-wan passed. In Garapan, the major shelter on the island sustained minor damage and repair work on it would take roughly a week.

On Alamagan, residents attempted to contact officials on other islands on September 17. Despite the extreme intensity of the storm, all sixteen residents on the island, including the 4-day old infant were safe. During their attempted contact, the connection was poor and hard to understand. The following day, the United States Navy sent a ship and helicopter to the island to assess the situation. The Navy stated that the entire island of Alamagan was a total loss, with all but one of the structures, a facility for laboratory and research, completely destroyed and most of the islands' trees downed.

Once on the island, they determined that all residents needed to be evacuated "...whether they like or not". The first to be evacuated from the island were the infant and six people in the family; the infant was taken to a hospital on Saipan as a precaution. On nearby Agrihan, it was determined that the residents on the island also needed to be evacuated. Prior to their evacuations, they were given relief supplies, mainly food and water, to survive for five days. Roughly 260 gallons of fresh water, 50 lbs of rice and other health or comfort supplies were delivered by Helicopter Sea Combat Squadron 25 to both islands. On September 21, the Salvation Army announced that residents displaced by the storm would be received donated items, such as clothing, toys, pillows and baby formula.

See also

Typhoon Dolphin (2015)
Typhoon Lekima (2013)
Typhoon Isa
Typhoon Melor (2009)

References

External links

JMA Best Track Data of Typhoon Choi-wan (0914) 
JTWC Best Track Data  of Super Typhoon 15W (Choi-wan)
15W.CHOI-WAN from the U.S. Naval Research Laboratory

2009 Pacific typhoon season
Typhoons
Choi-wan